This is a list of songs about County Tipperary, Ireland. 

 “Any Tipperary town” -written by Pat Ely, recorded by many artists including [[Daniel O'Donnell.
 “Brennan on the Moor” - 19th Century ballad.
 "Cill Chais" - a lament related to the family at Kilcash Castle.
 "The Bansha Peeler"
 "Éamonn an Chnoic" - about Éamonn Ó Riain, an Irish aristocrat who lived in County Tipperary from 1670 to 1724 and became a rapparee.
 "Fair Clonmel" 
 "Flynn of Ballinure"
 "Galtee Mountain Boy"
 "The Glen of Aherlow" (also known as "Patrick Sheehan") - based on the true story of a young ex-soldier from the Glen of Aherlow named Patrick Sheehan who was blinded at the Siege of Sevastopol.
 "Goodbye Mick (Leaving Tipperary)" - recorded by P.J. Murrihy and by Ryan's Fancy
 “Home to Aherlow”
 “It's a Long Way to Tipperary”, British Music hall song written in 1912  by Henry James "Harry" Williams and co-credited to Jack Judge.
 "The Hills Of Killenaule" - music by Liam O’Donnell and lyrics by Davy Cormack, both from Killenaule
 "Michael Hogan"
 "Munster Hurling Final"
 "My Old Tipperary Home"
 “Rare Clonmel”
 "Seán Treacy" - ballad about Seán Treacy, leader of the Third Tipperary Brigade, IRA, who was killed in Dublin in 1920
 "She Lived Beside The Anner"
 "Slievenamon" - one of the best-known Tipperary songs, written by Charles Kickham
 "Sliabh na mBan" - an Irish-language song composed by Michéal O Longáin of Carrignavar and translated by Seamus Ennis, about the massacre in July 1798 of a party of Tipperary insurgents at Carrigmoclear on the slopes of Slievenamon
”Tipperary on my Mind”
 "Strolling Through Tipperary"
 "Streets of Mulllinahone"
 "Tipperary Hills For Me"
 "The Tipperary Christening"
 "Tipperary Far Away"
 "Tipperary" - a love song written in 1907 by Leo Curley, James M. Fulton and J. Fred Helf.
 "The Station of Knocklong"
 "Shanagolden" - written by Seán McCarthy. Recorded by Connie Foley, among others.
 "The Further it is From Tipperary" by Jack Norworth.

See also
 Music of Ireland

References

Irish ballads
 
Irish styles of music
Tipperary
Tipperary